Bernardo Oneto Gomes (born 12 November 1993) is a water polo player from Brazil. He was part of the Brazilian team at the 2016 Summer Olympics, where the team was eliminated in the quarterfinals.

References

Brazilian male water polo players
Living people
1993 births
Water polo players at the 2015 Pan American Games
Pan American Games medalists in water polo
Pan American Games silver medalists for Brazil
Olympic water polo players of Brazil
Water polo players at the 2016 Summer Olympics
Medalists at the 2015 Pan American Games
21st-century Brazilian people